Melanotus villosus is a species of beetle in the family Elateridae and the genus Melanotus.

Description
The color of body and legs is black. It carries brown tarsi on its legs. And the antennas are brownish-black. Males have longer antennas and prothorax than females.

Distribution
The species can be found everywhere throughout England (Sherwood Forest), Wales, Scotland (especially in Loch Lomond, Dumfries, and Galloway), and the far North-west.

Ecology
The beetle eats old pine stumps.

References

External links
Images of Melanotus villosus

Beetles described in 1789
Taxa named by Johann Friedrich Gmelin
Beetles of Europe
Elateridae